A Masterpiece of Murder is a 1986 American TV movie starring Bob Hope and Don Ameche.

It was Hope's first and only made-for-TV movie.

Plot
A retired private eye teams up with a former jewel thief to solve a murder.

Cast
Bob Hope as Dan Dolan
Don Ameche as Frank Aherne
Jayne Meadows as Matilda Hussey
Claudia Christian as Julia Forsythe
Yvonne De Carlo as Mrs Murphy
Anne Francis as Ruth Beekman
Frank Gorshin as Pierre Rudin
Steven Keats as Lieutenant Simon Wax
Kevin McCarthy as Jonathan Hire
Anita Morris as Lola Crane
Clive Revill as Vincent Faunce
Stella Stevens as Deb Potts / Della Vance

Production
The film was shot in Vancouver.

References

External links

1986 television films
1986 films
American television films
Films scored by Richard Markowitz
Films directed by Charles S. Dubin